The Build Better More (BBM) is the infrastructure program of the Marcos administration (2022–2028). It superseded the Build! Build! Build! infrastructure program of the Duterte administration (2016–2022). The following Infrastructure Flagship Projects (IFP)s were identified by the National Economic and Development Authority (NEDA).

The Marcos administration approved 194 infrastructure projects, ranging from public transport, power, health, information technology, water resources, and agriculture. 77 of those project were carried from past administrations while 123 are “new and initiated” by the Marcos administration. The total cost for the Build Better More program is PHP 9-trillion.

Infrastructure Flagship Projects

Public transportation

Roads

Airports

Seaports

Urban development

References

External link
 List of Infrastructure Flagship Projects (as of March 9, 2023)

Presidency of Bongbong Marcos
Economic history of the Philippines